Heininen is a surname. Notable people with the surname include:

Kaarlo Heininen (1853–1926), Finnish politician
Paavo Heininen (1938–2022), Finnish composer and pianist

See also
Heinonen

Finnish-language surnames
Surnames of Finnish origin